The Roman Catholic Archdiocese of Barquisimeto is a Latin Catholic Metropolitan archdiocese in northwestern Venezuela's Lara state.

History 
 Established on 7 March 1863 as Diocese of Barquisimeto, on territory split off from the then Diocese of Mérida (now Metropolitan)
 Suppressed on 14 August 1867, its territory reassigned to the new, short-lived Diocese of Coro y Barquisimeto (in fact a see transfer to Coro)
 Restored on 22 October 1869 as Diocese of Barquisimeto from that (suppressed) Diocese of Coro y Barquisimeto
 Lost territory on 12 October 1922 to establish the Diocese of Coro and on 7 June 1954 to establish the Diocese of Guanare, its own suffragan
 Promoted on 30 April 1966 as Metropolitan Archdiocese of Barquisimeto.
 Lost territory again to establish two more suffragans : on 7 October 1966 the Diocese of San Felipe and on 25 July 1922 the Diocese of Carora.

Special churches 
Its cathedral episcopal see is the very modern Cathedral of Our Lady of Mount Carmel in Barquisimeto. There is also a Minor Basilica : Basílica el Santo Cristo de la Gracia, also in Barquisimeto.

Bishops 
(all Roman rite)

 Episcopal ordinaries Suffragan Bishops of Barquisimeto 
 Victor José Díez Navarrete (22 October 1869 – death 1893), previously Bishop of Coro y Barquisimeto (Venezuela) (1868.06.22 – 1869.10.22)
 Gregorio Rodríguez y Obregón (21 May 1894 – death 1900)
 Aguedo Felipe Alvarado Liscano (15 August 1910 – death 26 September 1926)
 Enrique María Dubuc Moreno (26 September 1926 – 17 November 1947), previously Titular Bishop of Zaraï (25 May 1926 – 26 September 1926) & Coadjutor Bishop of Barquisimeto (25 May 1926 – 26 September 1926; emeritate as Titular Bishop of Maximiana in Numidia (17 November 1947– death 22 June 1962)
 Críspulo Benítez Fontúrvel (21 October 1949 – 30 April 1966 see below)Metropolitan Archbishops of Barquisimeto 
 Críspulo Benítez Fontúrvel (see above'' 30 April 1966 – 18 October 1982), also President of Episcopal Conference of Venezuela (1972 – 1978)
 Tulio Manuel Chirivella Varela (18 October 1982 previously Bishop of Margarita (Venezuela) (5 April 1974 – 18 October 1982)
 Antonio José López Castillo (22 December 2007 – 25 March 2020); previously Titular Bishop of Theuzi (26 February 1988 – 1 August 1992) & Auxiliary Bishop of Maracaibo (Venezuela) (26 February 1988 – 1 August 1992), Bishop of Barinas (Venezuela) (01 August 1992 – 27 December 2001), Metropolitan Archbishop of Calabozo (Venezuela) (27 December 2001– 22 December 2007)

Coadjutor bishop
Enrique María Dubuc Moreno (1926)

Auxiliary bishops
Marcial Augusto Ramírez Ponce (1967–1970),appointed Bishop of La Guaira
Eduardo Herrera Riera (1970–1994), appointed Bishop of Carora
José Luis Azuaje Ayala (1999–2006), appointed Bishop of El Vigia-San Carlos del Zulia

Other priest of this diocese who became bishop
Manuel Felipe Díaz Sánchez, appointed Auxiliary Bishop of Cumaná in 1997

Province 
Its ecclesiastical province comprises the Metropolitan's own archbishopric and the following Suffragan sees:
 Roman Catholic Diocese of Acarigua–Araure
 Roman Catholic Diocese of Carora
 Roman Catholic Diocese of Guanare
 Roman Catholic Diocese of San Felipe, Venezuela

See also 
 Roman Catholicism in Venezuela

References

External links 

 GCatholic.org, with incumbent biography links 
 Catholic Hierarchy 

Roman Catholic dioceses in Venezuela
Roman Catholic Ecclesiastical Province of Barquisimeto
Religious organizations established in 1863
Roman Catholic dioceses and prelatures established in the 19th century
1863 establishments in Venezuela